Thomas a'Becket (March 17, 1808 - January 6, 1890) was an actor and musician credited with writing the music and the words, in 1843, to "Columbia, the Gem of the Ocean".
Born in Chatham, England, A'Becket came to the United States in 1837 and spent much of his life in Philadelphia. At one time, he served as the stage manager of the actor Edwin Booth and for many years was the director of the Walnut Street Theatre, in Philadelphia, where he also had a long acting career. During his early years in America, he gave music lessons and sang in operas.

He died in Philadelphia from heart failure and was buried in the Fernwood Cemetery, west of the city. His diaries are on deposit at the New York Public Library.

References

1808 births
1890 deaths
Male actors from Philadelphia
Musicians from Philadelphia
People from Chatham, Kent
British emigrants to the United States
Burials at Fernwood Cemetery (Lansdowne, Pennsylvania)